Rabindranath Thakur Mahavidyalaya, established in 2012, is a general degree college in Bishalgarh,  Sipahijala district, Tripura. It offers undergraduate courses in arts and sciences. It is affiliated to  Tripura University. 
The college is recognized by the University Grants Commission (UGC).

References

External links

Colleges affiliated to Tripura University
Educational institutions established in 2012
Universities and colleges in Tripura
2012 establishments in Tripura
Colleges in Tripura